Amanda Horney (1857–1953), was a Swedish politician (Social Democrat).  She belonged to the pioneers of the labour movement, the Social Democratic movement, as well as the women's rights movement in Sweden.

She was co-founder and first chairman of Allmänna kvinnoklubben in 1892–1893, deputy chairman in 1919–1922, Board Member of the Kvinnokonferensen in 1907–1910, Board Member of the National Association for Women's Suffrage (Sweden), and Member of the Poor Help Board of the Klara Parish in Stockholm in 1920–1940.

References

Further reading 
 

1857 births
1953 deaths
19th-century Swedish politicians
20th-century Swedish politicians
Swedish social democrats
Swedish trade unionists
Swedish women's rights activists
Swedish suffragists
19th-century Swedish women politicians
20th-century Swedish women politicians